Kiều Công Hãn (died 967) was a warlord of Vietnam during the Period of the 12 Warlords.

Hãn was a grandson of Kiều Công Tiễn. He was also an elder brother of another warlord, Kiều Thuận. He held Phong Châu (modern Việt Trì and Lâm Thao, Phú Thọ Province), and titled himself Kiều Tam Chế (矯三制).

He was defeated by Đinh Bộ Lĩnh in 967.

References

967 deaths
Year of birth unknown
10th-century Vietnamese people
People from Phú Thọ province
Anarchy of the 12 Warlords